The Noor-ul-Ain is one of the largest pink diamonds in the world, and the centre piece of the tiara of the same name.

History 
The diamond is believed to have been recovered from the mines of Golconda, Hyderabad in India. It was first in possession with the nizam Abul Hasan Qutb Shah, later it was given as a peace offering to the Mughal emperor Aurangazeb when he defeated him in a siege. It was brought into the Iranian Imperial collection after the Persian king Nader Shah Afshar looted Delhi in the 18th century.

The Noor-ul-Ain is believed to have once formed part of an even larger gem called the Great Table diamond.  That larger diamond is thought to have been cut in two, with one section becoming the Noor-ul-Ain and the other the Daria-i-Noor diamond. Both of these pieces are currently part of the Iranian Crown Jewels.

History of the tiara
The Noor-ul-Ain is the principal diamond mounted in a tiara of the same name made for Iranian Empress Farah Pahlavi's wedding to Shah Mohammad Reza Pahlavi in 1958. The tiara was designed by Harry Winston. It is a modern design, featuring 324 pink, yellow, and white diamonds set in platinum. The tiara forms part of the Iranian crown jewels, held at the National Treasury of Iran in the Central Bank in Tehran.

It is a Type IIa diamond.

See also
 Great Table diamond
 Koh-i-Noor diamond
 List of diamonds
 List of largest rough diamonds
 Elizabeth II's jewels

References

Anna Malecka, "The Mystery of the Nur al-Ayn Diamond", Gems & Jewellery: The Gemmological Association of Great Britain, volume 23 (7), August/September 2014, pp. 20-22;

External links
Picture of Nur-Ul-Ain
A Feature

Jewels of the Mughal Empire
Iranian National Jewels
Pink diamonds
Golconda diamonds
Wars involving Afsharid Iran